Odontozineus penicillatus is a species of beetle in the family Cerambycidae, the only species in the genus Odontozineus.

References

Acanthocinini